Komňa is a municipality and village in Uherské Hradiště District in the Zlín Region of the Czech Republic. It has about 600 inhabitants.

History
The first written mention of Komňa is from 1261.

Notable people
John Amos Comenius (1592–1670), philosopher and pedagogue; lived here and was possibly born here

References

Villages in Uherské Hradiště District